The Pitman’s Happy Times is a Geordie folk song written in the 19th century by J.P.(Joseph Philip) Robson, known as "The bard af ths Tyne and minstrel of the Wear", in a style deriving from music hall.

Lyrics 
J.P.(Joseph Philip) Robson, was one of the most prolific of all the Geordie poets of the time. He was already known for his classical poetry before he was persuaded to write in dialect and write lyrics for songs. Many of the dialectic works make for a feast of dialect materials. The song was written in the middle of the 19th century. A note in the 1872  edition read, “Had this admirer of the 'good old times' lived at the present time (1872), when pitmen's wages are advancing 10 and 15 per cent, at a bound, he even must have doubted whether the past was better than the present”.

The lyrics are as follows:

Recordings
  Megson recorded “The Pitman’s Happy Times” as part of the studio album entitled “Take Yourself A Wife” (Released on 29 September 2008 by EDJ records) – unfortunately it is not in dialect
   YouTube recording of The Pitman’s Happy Times, performed by Megson (an English folk duo composed of husband and wife Stu and Debbie Hanna, the name coming from the nam,e of Debbie’s deceased dog)

See also
Geordie dialect words

References 

English folk songs
Songs related to Newcastle upon Tyne
1850s songs
Northumbrian folklore